The following are the national records in athletics in Ethiopia maintained by Ethiopian Athletic Federation (EAF).

Outdoor

Key to tables:

+ = en route to a longer distance

h = hand timing

A = affected by altitude

Mx = mixed race

Wo = woman only race

# = not recognised by IAAF

y = denotes 880 yards

OT = oversized track (> 200m in circumference)

Men

Women

Mixed

Indoor

Men

Women

Notes

References
General
World Athletics Statistic Handbook 2022: National Outdoor Records
World Athletics Statistic Handbook 2022: National Indoor Records
Specific

External links
EAF web site

Ethiopia
Athletics
Records
Athletics